Nunca pasa nada or Nothing Ever Happens is a 1963 Spanish-French drama film directed by Juan Antonio Bardem. Starring a mixed cast of French and Spanish actors it was shot both in Spanish and French. It was a commercial flop at the time of its release.

The film was entered into the Venice Film Festival. Julia Gutiérrez Caba was named Best Actress in Spain by the Cinema Writers Circle, and received the Fotogramas de Plata prize.

Nunca pasa nada depicts an environment and characters similar to the ones appearing in Bardem's great success, Calle Mayor (Main Street), to the point that some critics nicknamed it disdainfully Calle Menor (Minor Street). However, current evaluation of Bardem's works consider Nunca pasa nada a very appreciable film.

Plot
A French variety company travels across Spain, coming back to France. Their bus stops when damaged in a small town in Castile, called Medina del Zarzal. The vedette star (showgirl) Jacqueline (Corinne Marchand) is sick and has to remain in the hospital where she is operated upon. The doctor (Antonio Casas) falls in love with her. She represents the freedom, the foreign, the forbidden. Her presence in the village is a revolution for all the people: students, priests, rich men. The doctor's wife, Julia (Julia Gutiérrez Caba), has to fight with the love proposition made by the local French language teacher (Jean-Pierre Cassel), the only person in town who can speak to the foreigner.

Cast
Corinne Marchand as Jacqueline
Antonio Casas as Enrique
Jean-Pierre Cassel as Juan
Julia Gutiérrez Caba as Julia
Pilar Gómez Ferrer as Doña Eulalia
Ana María Ventura as Doña Assunta
Matilde Muñoz Sampedro	as Doña Obdulia
Alfonso Godá as Pepe
Rafael Bardem as Don Marcelino

References

External links
 

1963 films
1960s Spanish-language films
1960s French-language films
1963 drama films
French black-and-white films
Spanish black-and-white films
Films set in Spain
Films directed by Juan Antonio Bardem
Spanish drama films
French drama films
1960s multilingual films
Spanish multilingual films
French multilingual films
1960s Spanish films
1960s French films
Spanish-language French films